Anthony Viti (born 1961) is an American artist who lives and works at Brooklyn, New York. He is a visual artist and an art educator. Viti currently teaches at School of Visual Arts and Parsons.

Work
Viti's art practice has focused on narratives of body and HIV and resulting sexual subcultures. He uses a variety of media; painting, sculpture, video, and installation that is both confrontational and high-spirited.

Exhibitions
He had solo exhibitions at Art During the Occupation Gallery, Brooklyn, NY; Hudson D. Walker Gallery, Provincetown, MA; Deven Golden Fine Art, New York, NY; Tibor de Nagy Gallery, New York, NY; Leslie-Lohman Museum of Gay and Lesbian Art. His work has been exhibited in group exhibitions at the Ratio 3, San Francisco; Cobra Museum, Amsterdam; SCA Contemporary Art, Albuquerque; Sue Scott Gallery, New York, NY; Kinkead Contemporary, Culver City, CA; David Krut Projects, New York, NY; Ethan Cohen Fine Arts, New York, NY.

Awards and honors
Pollock-Krasner Foundation
Fine Arts Work Center Fellowship
Elizabeth Foundation for the Arts
Penny McCall Foundation
Art Matters Inc.

Publications
San Francisco Bay Guardian
Contemporary Art Quarterly
M/E/A/N/I/N/G: An Anthology of Artists'
Writings, Theory, and Criticism; ARTnews; New York Times; Art in America; Artforum.]

Collections
 The Metropolitan Museum of Art

References

External links
 Anthony Viti's Website

1961 births
Living people
American male artists
Parsons School of Design faculty
Rutgers University alumni
School of Visual Arts faculty
State University of New York at Purchase alumni